Peter Hill (28 January 1923 – 3 October 2002) was an Australian cricketer. He played in one first-class match for South Australia in 1949/50.

See also
 List of South Australian representative cricketers

References

External links
 

1923 births
2002 deaths
Australian cricketers
South Australia cricketers
Cricketers from Adelaide